Pectinatella is a genus of bryozoans belonging to the family Pectinatellidae.

The species of this genus are found in Europe and Northern America.

Species
From:

Pectinatella davenporti 
Pectinatella magnifica

References

Bryozoan genera